Richard Gerard may refer to:

Richard Gerard of Hilderstone (1635–1680), Roman Catholic landowner
Richard Gerard (bishop), spiritual protector of the Jerusalem obedience of Order of Saint Lazarus
Richard Geoffrey Gerard (1904–1997), New Zealand politician